Indians in Moscow are an English synth-pop band formed in Hull in 1981 who later moved into the techno and house music genres.

History
The band was formed in 1981 by keyboard players Pete Riches and Stuart Walton (formerly of The Most), and singer Adele Nozedar. The band later expanded to five members with the addition of a guitarist and a drummer (Rich Hornby). The band's first release was a contribution to the various artists compilation Your Secret's Safe with Us in 1982. 

They came to fame on the cult 1980s Channel 4 music TV show The Tube as part of the show's Hull music special, and had three hits on the UK Indie Chart with "Naughty Miranda", "I Wish I Had" and "Jack Pelter & His Sex Change Chicken". After the release of the Big Wheel EP, the band's only (self-titled) album was released in 1985. The band split up shortly afterwards, with guitarist Nik Corfield releasing one solo single, "The Pixie Shop", late in 1985.

After Indians in Moscow split, Nozedar formed a new band, The Fever Tree, along with drummer Tom Hosie (who had replaced Hornby), Ali McMordie from Stiff Little Fingers and guitarist Rob Dean of Japan. In 1988, Nozedar would feature as part of the promotion for "Beat Dis" by Bomb the Bass, a sample-heavy dance single which would peak at number two on the (Official) UK Singles Chart dated 21 to 27 February 1988. 

Riches and Walton reformed the band in 1998 with singer Chris Guard, releasing the singles "Wrong Love" and "Babylon", and the album Ten Days to Live, which they self-financed. After Guard left, Riches and Walton recruited house and garage DJ Simon Le Vans, releasing the Something Wonderful EP. The group has continued since, with two albums released in 2004. Walton and Guard worked together again in the band Gregoryz Girl.

In 2011, their self-titled debut album was reissued on CD via Other Voices Records.

Discography

Albums
Indians in Moscow (1984), Kennick
Ten Days to Live (1994), Nemesis
Indians in Moscow (2011), Other Voices Records

Singles
Chart placings shown are from the UK Indie Chart
"Naughty Miranda" (1983) Kennick No. 5
"I Wish I Had" (1984) Kennick No. 27
"Jack Pelter & His Sex Change Chicken" (1984) Kennick No. 16 - UK chart no. 101
Big Wheel EP (1984) Kennick
"Wrong Love" (1991) Posh Music
"Babylon"
"People in Space" (1998) Mankind
Melt Productions E.P. (1998) Melt Productions

References

External links 
Indians in Moscow website
Dust on the Stylus review
Other Voices Records website

English electronic music groups
English dance music groups
English synth-pop groups
English new wave musical groups
British synth-pop new wave groups
Musical groups from Kingston upon Hull
Musical groups established in 1981
Musical groups disestablished in 1985
Musical groups reestablished in 1998